Gibbula senegalensis is a species of sea snail, a marine gastropod mollusk in the family Trochidae, the top snails.

Description

Distribution
This species occurs in the Atlantic Ocean off the Cape Verdes and is widespread off West Africa.

References

Rolán E., 2005. Malacological Fauna From The Cape Verde Archipelago. Part 1, Polyplacophora and Gastropoda

External links

senegalensis
Gastropods of Cape Verde
Invertebrates of West Africa
Gastropods described in 1853